Jackson County is a county located in the far southwest of the U.S. state of North Carolina. As of the 2020 census, the population was 43,109. Since 1913 its county seat has been Sylva, which replaced Webster.

Jackson County comprises the Cullowhee, NC Micropolitan Statistical Area. Cullowhee is the site of Western Carolina University (WCU). In the early 21st century, the university has more than 12,000 students, nearly twice the number of the permanent residents of Cullowhee. The university has a strong influence in the region and county.

More than 10 percent of the county residents identify as Native American, mostly Cherokee. The federally recognized Eastern Band of Cherokee Indians is based at Qualla Boundary, land that consists of territory in both Jackson and neighboring Swain County. This is the only federally recognized tribe in North Carolina, and one among three federally recognized Cherokee tribes nationally.  The other two are based in what is now the state of Oklahoma, former Indian Territory.

History
This area was part of Cherokee Nation homelands at the time of European encounter. Cullowhee was one of several historic Cherokee towns that had developed along the Tuckasegee River, which has its headwaters here and runs into Swain County to the north. Like several other Cherokee towns in the region, Cullowhee was centered around a single earthwork platform mound, known as Cullowhee Mound, built by ancestral peoples. It is estimated to have been built about 1000 CE, by people during the period of the South Appalachian Mississippian culture. Archeological excavations have revealed evidence of indigenous peoples here since 3000 BCE.

While most Cherokee were forced out of the area through succeeding treaties for land cessions, followed by removal to Indian Territory in the late 1830s, hundreds of Cherokee stayed in Western North Carolina. Their descendants form most of the federally recognized Eastern Band of Cherokee Indians (EBCI), the only tribe in the state to have this status. They are based on Qualla Boundary, which is located in Swain and Jackson counties. Their citizens make up most of the more than ten percent of people in Jackson County who identify as Native American on the US census.

Mid-19th century to present
The European-American population increased slowly in this isolated, mountainous area of the state. Jackson County was not organized until 1851, when it was created from parts of Haywood and Macon counties. It was named for Andrew Jackson, President of the United States from 1829 to 1837, who promoted Indian (reds) Removal from the Southeast in order to allow development by European Americans (whites). The original county courts were held at the home of Dan Bryson in Beta, Scott Creek township. They were moved to Webster the following year.

In 1861 parts of Jackson and Henderson counties were combined to form Transylvania County. In 1871 parts of Jackson and Macon counties were combined to form Swain County. In 1913 Sylva was designated by the legislature as the county seat of Jackson County.

In the 1880s, mining companies began to mine for kaolin, used to produce porcelain. Charles Joseph Harris (11 Sept. 1853–14 Feb. 1944) moved here from Denver, Colorado about 1888 and became important to development of the county and Western North Carolina from the late 19th century into the 20th century. He eventually established his own mining companies, and shipped kaolin to Trenton, New Jersey, among other places, which was a major manufacturing center. He also acquired tens of thousands of acres of woodland and established lumber businesses. His two sons, David Rust and Robert Ward Harris, joined him in these family businesses.

Geography

The Tuckasegee River flows through the county.

National protected areas 
 Blue Ridge Parkway (part)
 Ellicott Rock Wilderness (part)
 Nantahala National Forest (part)
 Judaculla Rock (part)
 Cherokee Indian Reservation/Qualla Boundary (part)

State and local protected areas/sites 
 Judaculla Rock
 Ralph J Andrews Recreation Park
 Salt Rock Gap
 Southern Highlands Reserve (part)
 The Pines Recreation Area

Major water bodies 
 Bear Creek Lake
 Brushy Creek
 Cedar Cliff Lake
 Chattooga River
 Connelly Creek
 Dark Ridge Creek
 Greens Creek
 Horsepasture River
 Lake Glenville
 Oconaluftee River
 Slickens Creek
 Toxaway River
 Tuckasegee River
 Wayhutta Creek
 West Fork Tuckasegee River
 Whitewater River

Adjacent counties 
 Haywood County - northeast
 Transylvania County - east
 Oconee County, South Carolina - south
 Macon County - west
 Swain County - northwest

Transportation

Airport
Jackson County Airport is located here, one mile (1.6 km) east of Cullowhee. It is governed by the Jackson County Airport Authority.

Railroads
Norfolk Southern Railway operates a portion known as the Murphy Branch through Jackson County, providing a rail connection with the rest of the country. In Sylva, Norfolk Southern connects with the Great Smoky Mountains Railroad. Interchange between the two lines is handled near the site of the Jackson Paper Company. Great Smoky Mountains RR operates the rest of the Murphy Branch from Dillsboro to Andrews.

Because of competition with independent automobile traffic, passenger rail traffic declined; it was stopped in 1948 from Sylva to Murphy. Despite widespread restructuring in the industry across the country, freight commercial service continued another forty-odd years before ending in 1983. In 2015, Watco, which purchased the section which Norfolk Southern previously owned, was reportedly in talks with the towns and counties in an attempt to build a viable tourist railroad clientele. The major obstacle for such service is the Cowee Mountain Tunnel, which does not meet height and weight specifications for modern rail engines and passenger cars.

Major highways
Jackson County is served by three main roads: the Great Smoky Mountains Expressway runs east–west across the northern half of the county and connects the county seat of Sylva to Waynesville and Asheville in the east and Cherokee, Andrews and Murphy in the west. North Carolina State Highway 107 connects Sylva and Western Carolina University to Cashiers in the south. U.S. Highway 64 traverses east–west across the southern part of the county connecting Cashiers to Brevard in the east and Highlands in the west.
 
 
 
 
 
 
 
 
 
 
 
 
 
 Blue Ridge Parkway

Demographics

2020 census

As of the 2020 United States census, there were 43,109 people, 16,773 households, and 9,964 families residing in the county.

2010 census
As of the census of 2010, there were 40,271 people.  As of the 2000 Census, there were 13,191 households and 8,587 families residing in the county.  The population density was 68 people per square mile (26/km2).  There were 19,291 housing units at an average density of 39 per square mile (15/km2). The racial makeup of the county was 85.68% White, 1.67% Black or African American, 10.20% Native American (mostly Cherokee), 0.51% Asian, 0.02% Pacific Islander, 0.55% from other races, and 1.38% from two or more races.  1.74% of the population were Hispanic or Latino of any race. 18.5% identify as being of American, 13.7% as English, 11.3% as Irish, 10.5% as German and 9.2% as of Scots-Irish ancestry according to Census 2000. 95.3% spoke English, 2.1% Spanish and 1.5% Cherokee as their first language.

There were 13,191 households, out of which 25.50% had children under the age of 18 living with them, 51.40% were married couples living together, 10.00% had a female householder with no husband present, and 34.90% were non-families. 27.00% of all households were made up of individuals, and 9.80% had someone living alone who was 65 years of age or older.  The average household size was 2.30 and the average family size was 2.79.

In the county, the population was spread out, with 19.00% under the age of 18, 17.90% from 18 to 24, 24.40% from 25 to 44, 25.00% from 45 to 64, and 13.80% who were 65 years of age or older.  The median age was 36 years. For every 100 females there were 95.40 males.  For every 100 females age 18 and over, there were 93.10 males.

The median income for a household in the county was $32,552, and the median income for a family was $40,876. Males had a median income of $27,738 versus $22,029 for females. The per capita income for the county was $17,582.  About 9.50% of families and 15.10% of the population were below the poverty line, including 15.70% of those under age 18 and 15.20% of those age 65 or over.

Government and public safety

Government
As mandated by the laws of North Carolina, Jackson County has a commission-manager form of government. The five members of Board of Commissioners are elected at-large to four-year terms. This system of at-large voting, rather than having representatives elected from single-member districts, favors candidates supported by the majority of the population. Together they appoint and oversee the actions of a County Manager, who administers operations.

Jackson County is a member of the regional Southwestern Commission council of governments.

Jackson County contains a portion of the Qualla Boundary, a land trust of historic territory of the federally recognized Eastern Band of Cherokee Indians. The tribe is sovereign in its territory and is the only federally recognized tribe in the state. The reservation operates Harrah's Cherokee Casino, which is open to the public, as are associated resort facilities there.

Sheriff and Sylva PD
The Jackson County Sheriff provides court protection, jail administration, patrol and detective services for all of Jackson County except for incorporated Sylva, which has a municipal police department.

Politics
Together with Buncombe and Watauga counties, Jackson is considered one of three "swing" counties in Western North Carolina. Except for 1980, it would vote for the winner in every Presidential election from 1960 to 2008. The exception was 1980, when Jimmy Carter won the county but lost nationally.

In 2012 voters here favored Republican candidate Mitt Romney, who was defeated by President Barack Obama. In 2016 county voters split their vote, favoring Donald Trump for the presidency, but Democrat Roy Cooper for state governor. The county was one of four in the state to do so. In 2020, Jackson County voters favored incumbent Donald Trump, but Democrat Joe Biden won the election nationally.

2020 presidential election
In 2020 the county and the state voted for incumbent Donald Trump, but Democrat Joe Biden carried the election overall, winning both the popular vote and electoral college.

2016 presidential election
In the 2016 Republican Primary in Jackson County, Donald Trump received 1,624 votes (or 39.5% of the total votes) followed by Ted Cruz, who had 1,434 votes (or 34.9% of the total votes).  In the 2016 Democratic Primary, Bernie Sanders received 3,021 votes (57.0% of the total); Hillary Clinton received 2,022 votes (38.1% of the total).

In the general election Donald Trump received 9,870 votes (or 52.7% of the total vote); Hillary Clinton received 7,713 votes (41.2% of the total vote) and Libertarian Candidate Gary Johnson received 742 votes (4.0% of total votes in the county).

Education 
Jackson County Public Schools serves all areas of the county except for the Qualla Boundary (Eastern Cherokee Reservation), which is instead zoned to Cherokee Central Schools. The county also is home to Western Carolina University in Cullowhee.

Communities

Towns
 Dillsboro
 Sylva (county seat)
 Webster

Village
 Forest Hills

Census-designated places
 Cashiers
 Cherokee
 Cullowhee (largest community)
 Glenville

Unincorporated communities

 Addie
 Balsam
 Beta
 Gay
 Savannah
 Tuckasegee
 Whittier
 Willets
 Wilmot

Townships
The county is divided into fifteen townships:

Barker's Creek: Named for the creek which starts here and flows through the township before entering the Tuckasegee River. It includes the Dicks Creek, Barkers Creek, and Wilmont communities. US 74/23 runs as a four-lane divided highway through the township.  The township is served by Smokey Mountain Elementary School and Smoky Mountain High School.  Formerly, the Log Cabin Association Consolidated School served the township, but it closed in 1980 when Smokey Mountain Elementary opened.

Canada: Named for the tall ridges, narrow valleys, and sharp peaks of this part of the county, the main waterway is the East Fork of the Tuckasegee River, which flows into the River Township before joining the West Fork, becoming the Tuckasegee River. There are four major lakes: Bear, Wolf, Tanasee Creek, and Ceader Cliff, in the township.  It is served by NC 281 and is one of the most remote locations in the county.  It is served by Cullowhee Valley School and Smoky Mountain High School. Before the 1990s, the schools for the area were Canada Consolidated School and Cullowhee High School, both closed in the 1980s.

Caney Fork: Named for the creek that flows through the township, which empties into the Tuckasegee River at East LaPorte. The main road is Caney Fork Road. The area is served by Cullowhee Valley School and Smoky Mountain High School. Prior to 1964, the schools that served the area were Johns Creek Elementary and Cullowhee High School.

Cashiers: Named for a lost horse, the town of Cashiers includes the communities of Panthertown Valley, Whiteside Cove, Fairfield, and Sapphire. It is served by NC 107 and US 64. The Eastern Continental Divide follows a ridge north of the township, and defines the boundaries between the Cashiers, Canada, and Glenville townships. The Chattooga, Horsepasture, and Toxaway rivers all originate or flow through the township. It is served by Blue Ridge School, which consolidated Glenville School and Cashiers Elementary in 1975.

Cullowhee: This is derived from the Cherokee name for the valley, which referred to a legendary figure, Judacullah. NC 107, Old NC 107, and NC 107-Alternate all serve the township as major roads; NC 107 is the only 4-lane roadway. Western Carolina University, the village of Forest Hills, and the communities of Speedwell, Old Cullowhee Road, Buzzards Roost, and Dicks Gap are all within the township.

In the nineteenth century, this was one of the first areas in the county to be settled by European Americansy, along with Caney Fork, River, Scott Creek, and Canada townships. It is the largest township by population according to the 2000 United States Census. The Cullowhee Creek, a tributary, and the Tuckasegee River both flow through the township; the confluence is around Old Cullowhee Road. The township is served by the local Cullowhee Valley School. Older children go to Smoky Mountain High School in Sylva. The former Cullowhee High School closed in 1988.

Dillsboro: Named after the Dills family who founded the town, the township also has the town of Dillsboro.  Scotts Creek arises to the northwest, flowing from Scott Creek Township through Sylva Township into Dillsboro Township, where it flows into the Tuckasegee River. US 74/23, US 441, and NC 107 converge in two major intersections within the township. The township is served by Smokey Mountain and Fairview elementary schools and by Smoky Mountain High School. It has not had its own school since Dillsboro Elementary closed in 1951. The students were transferred to Log Cabin School in Barkers Creek Township, or Sylva Elementary School in Sylva township.

Greens Creek: Named for the creek which flows through most of the township before emptying into Savannah Creek, this township is served by US 441, a four-lane highway along the western edge. Greens Creek Road goes through the middle of the township. The township is served by Fairview Elementary School and Smoky Mountain High School. It was formerly served by the Savannah Consolidated School, from 1940 to 1973.

Hamburg: Named for the fort and original name of Glenville, the township is served by NC 107. The area was once a large valley, but the valley was flooded in 1941 by a dam on the Tuckasegee River, which formed Lake Glenville. The West Fork of the Tuckasegee River originates within the township, and flows north into the River Township. Blue Ridge School is located in the township and serves the township. It developed in 1975 from the consolidation of the Glenville School and Cashiers Elementary School.

Mountain: Named for Cullowhee Mountain, this township is served by NC 107 Alternate. The headwaters of Cullowhee Creek are located here, flowing north into Cullowhee Township before joining the Tuckasegee River. It is served by Cullowhee Valley School/Smoky Mountain High School in Cullowhee and Sylva, respectively. It was formerly served by Cullowhee High School and Camp Lab Elementary.

Qualla: Named for the Qualla Boundary, which occupies most of the township, Qualla Township is served by US 441, US 19, and US 74/23. Smokey Mountain Elementary School is located in the township, resulting from the 1980 consolidation of Qualla Elementary School and Log Cabin Association Consolidated School. It is served by the Jackson County Public School System and the Cherokee Reservation School System.  Students can choose among Smokey Mountain Elementary/Smoky Mountain High School, Cherokee School, or Swain East Elementary, Swain Middle School, and Swain High School. A Cherokee language immersion school has been founded in the township. The communities of Qualla, Birdtown, Soco, Whittier, Indian Hills, and Wilmont are all located at least partially, if not wholly, within the township.

River: Named for the Tuckasegee River, which is formed within the township by the confluence of two streams, it is served by NC 107 and NC 281. The community of Tuckasegee is located in the township. It is served by Cullowhee Valley School/Smoky Mountain High School. Prior to 1958, Tuckasegee School and Cullowhee High School both operated here.

Savannah: Named for Savannah Creek, which runs through the district, this township includes the Viewpoint, Pumpkintown, Savannah, and Fort Wilderness communities.  The township is served by four-lane US 441. Fairview Elementary School and Smoky Mountain High School serve the township as well. From 1940 to 1973, it was home to Savannah Consolidated School. Its higher-grade students went to Webster High School and now Sylva-Webster High School.

Scotts Creek: Named for Scotts Creek, which starts here and flows through the township before passing into Sylva Township. It is served by US 74/23 and old US 19/23, which run through the five communities within the township: Balsam, Willets, Ochre Hill, Addie and Beta. The Murphy Branch Railroad also runs through the township. Scotts Creek School has served the township since 1951. It had a new building constructed in 2001. The old school building is now used for the Jackson County School of Alternatives (the HUB).

Sylva: Named for William D. Sylva, as is the town and county seat of Sylva, located within the township. It is served by NC 107, US 74/23, and BUS 23. The Jackson County Courthouse and Library are both located in the township. Scotts Creek runs through the township before flowing into the Tuckasegee in Dillsboro Township. The township is served by Fairview and Scotts Creek elementary schools and Smoky Mountain High School; the latter serves all the county. Consolidation since the late 20th century closed many smaller schools in the county.

Webster: Also the site of the town of Webster, this township is at the original geographical center of the county. Due to territorial changes, that is now Cullowhee Township. For many years, it had the only town in Jackson County. It is served by NC 116 and NC 107. The county seat designation and courthouse were located here from 1851 to 1913. Since Sylva was designated as the county seat, Webster lost business.  The schools that serve the township are Fairview Elementary School (1973) and Smoky Mountain High School (1960/1988).

In popular culture
Several movies have been filmed in the county. These include the action-adventure The Fugitive (1993), starring Harrison Ford and Tommy Lee Jones; the drama Deliverance (1972), which also set a scene against downtown Sylva; and the comedy My Fellow Americans (1996) starring Jack Lemmon and James Garner.
 The train wreck scene in The Fugitive was filmed in Dillsboro along the Great Smoky Mountains Railroad. The wreckage set can still be viewed on outbound train excursions from Dillsboro. The later scene in a small hospital was filmed at Harris Regional Hospital in Sylva.
 The Great Smoky Mountains Railroad was also used in the filming of My Fellow Americans. The characters are seen getting on to one of their trains as a stand-in for a charter train full of North Carolina Tar Heels fans headed for the NCAA Final Four.
 Sylva's Main Street was used in the filming of Three Billboards outside Ebbing, Missouri (2016).
 Ron Rash's 2008 novel, Serena, features Jackson County.
 David Joy's novels, Where All Light Tends to Go and The Weight of This World, are set in Jackson County.

See also
 List of counties in North Carolina
 National Register of Historic Places listings in Jackson County, North Carolina
 Great Smoky Mountains
 Great Smoky Mountains Expressway
 National Park Service
 List of national forests of the United States

References

External links

 
 
 Jackson County Travel & Tourism
 North Carolina GenWeb Jackson County - free genealogy resources for the county
 The Sylva Herald

 
Counties of Appalachia
1851 establishments in North Carolina
Populated places established in 1851